Berisso Partido is a small eastern partido of Buenos Aires Province in Argentina.

The district forms part of the historical territory of Gran La Plata, to the south of Buenos Aires.

Berisso is home to Club Atlético Villa San Carlos, a football club who currently play in the regionalised 3rd division of Argentine football.

Settlements
 Berisso
 Barrio Banco Provincia 
 Barrio El Carmen
 Barrio Universitario 
 Los Catorce
 Palo Blanco
 Paraje Los Talas
 Villa Argüello
 Villa Banco Constructor
 Villa Dolores
 Villa Independencia 
 Villa Nueva
 Villa Porteña
 Villa Progreso
 Villa San Carlos  
 Villa Zula

 
1957 establishments in Argentina
Partidos of Buenos Aires Province
La Plata